Barium carbonate is the inorganic compound with the formula BaCO3.  Like most alkaline earth metal carbonates, it is a white salt that is poorly soluble in water. It occurs as the mineral known as witherite.  In a commercial sense, it is one of the most important barium compounds.

Preparation
Barium carbonate is made commercially from barium sulfide by treatment with sodium carbonate at 60 to 70 °C (soda ash method) or, more commonly carbon dioxide at 40 to 90 °C:

In the soda ash process, an aqueous solution of barium sulfide is treated with sodium carbonate:
BaS + H2O + CO2  →  BaCO3 + H2S

Reactions
Barium carbonate reacts with acids such as hydrochloric acid to form soluble barium salts, such as barium chloride:
 + 2 HCl →  +  + 

Pyrolysis of barium carbonate gives barium oxide.

Uses
It is mainly used to remove sulfate impurities from feedstock of the chlor-alkali process.  Otherwise it is a common precursor to barium-containing compounds such as ferrites.

Other uses
Barium carbonate is widely used in the ceramics industry as an ingredient in glazes. It acts as a flux, a matting and crystallizing agent and combines with certain colouring oxides to produce unique colours not easily attainable by other means. Its use is somewhat controversial since some claim that it can leach from glazes into food and drink. To provide a safe means of use, BaO is often used in fritted form.

In the brick, tile, earthenware and pottery industries barium carbonate is added to clays to precipitate soluble salts (calcium sulfate and magnesium sulfate) that cause efflorescence.

References

External links

Barium compounds
Carbonates
Pyrotechnic colorants